The 1974 Barnet Council election took place on 2 May 1974 to elect members of Barnet London Borough Council in London, England. The whole council was up for election and the Conservative party stayed in overall control of the council. There were 60 councillors elected in 20 wards, each with 3 councillors, out of which 42 were Conservative, 17 were Labour and one represented the Hadley Ward Residents' Association. There also 10 aldermen, 8 Conservative and 2 Labour.

Background

Election result
Overall turnout in the election was 39.1%.

|}

Ward results

Arkley

Brunswick Park

Burnt Oak

Childs Hill

Colindale

East Barnet

East Finchley

Edgware

Finchley

Friern Barnet

Garden Suburb

Golders Green

Hadley

(Hadley Ward Residents' Association)

Hale

Hendon

Mill Hill

St Paul’s

Totteridge

West Hendon

Woodhouse

By-elections between 1974 and 1978

Brunswick Park

Woodhouse

Burnt Oak

East Barnet

References

1974
1974 London Borough council elections